Vasile Copil (29 February 1936 – 22 June 2018) was a Romanian footballer who played as a midfielder.

International career
Vasile Copil played three friendly matches for Romania, making his debut on 28 September 1955 under coach Gheorghe Popescu I in a 1–0 victory against Belgium. His following two games were a 1–1 against Bulgaria and a 2–0 loss against Sweden.

References

External links

1936 births
2018 deaths
Romanian footballers
Romania international footballers
Place of birth missing
Association football midfielders
Liga I players
FC Progresul București players
FC Rapid București players